Flory may refer to: 

 Flory (surname)
 Flory Van Donck (1912-1992), Belgian golfer
 Flory Cirque, a cirque (valley) in Victoria Land, Antarctica
 Flory (heraldry), in heraldry

See also 
 Flory convention in chemistry
 Cross fleury, heraldic element
 Fleury (disambiguation)
 Fleurey (disambiguation)
 Florey (disambiguation)
 Florrie (disambiguation)